Charles Devendeville (8 March 1882 in Lesquin – 19 September 1914 in Reims) was a French swimmer and Olympic champion. He competed at the 1900 Olympic Games in Paris, where he received a gold medal in the underwater swimming. He died of injuries during the First World War, at age 32.

See also
 List of Olympians killed in World War I

References

External links
 

1882 births
1914 deaths
People from Lesquin
French male freestyle swimmers
French male water polo players
Olympic swimmers of France
Olympic water polo players of France
Swimmers at the 1900 Summer Olympics
Water polo players at the 1900 Summer Olympics
Olympic gold medalists for France
French military personnel killed in World War I
Medalists at the 1900 Summer Olympics
Olympic gold medalists in swimming
Sportspeople from Nord (French department)
19th-century French people
20th-century French people